Alexios Kolitsopoulos (born April 24, 1975) is a retired amateur Greek Greco-Roman wrestler, who competed in the men's middleweight category. He won a silver medal in the 76-kg division at the 2001 Mediterranean Games in Tunis, Tunisia, and had been selected to the nation's Olympic wrestling team when Greece hosted the 2004 Summer Olympics in Athens. Kolitsopoulos also trained for Iraklis Wrestling Club in Peristeri, under his personal coach Charalampos Cholidis.

Kolitsopoulos qualified for the Greek squad in the men's 74 kg class at the 2004 Summer Olympics in Athens. He filled up an entry by the International Federation of Association Wrestling and the Hellenic Olympic Committee, as Greece received an automatic berth for being the host nation. Amassed the home crowd inside Ano Liossia Olympic Hall, Kolitsopoulos started the prelim pool with a 2–2 victory and no penalty over Azerbaijan's Vugar Aslanov in overtime, before he lost his next matches each to three-time Olympian Tamás Berzicza of Hungary (3–0) and eventual Olympic champion Aleksandr Dokturishvili of Uzbekistan (8–4). Placing third in the pool round and twelfth overall, Kolitsopoulos failedto advance to the quarterfinals.

References

External links
Profile – International Wrestling Database

1975 births
Living people
Olympic wrestlers of Greece
Wrestlers at the 2004 Summer Olympics
Sportspeople from Athens
Greek male sport wrestlers
Mediterranean Games silver medalists for Greece
Competitors at the 2001 Mediterranean Games
Mediterranean Games medalists in wrestling